The 1975 Cork Junior Hurling Championship was the 78th staging of the Cork Junior Hurling Championship since its establishment by the Cork County Board. The championship began on 28 September 1975 and ended on 16 November 1975.

On 16 November 1975, Inniscarra won the championship following a 5-07 to 3-08 defeat of Ballymartle in the final at the Mardyke Grounds. It remains their only championship title in the grade.

Inniscarra's Jamesie O'Leary was the championship's top scorer with 4-03.

Results

Quarter-finals

Ballyhea received a bye in this round.

Semi-finals

Final

Championship statistics

Top scorers
Overall

In a single game

References

Cork Junior Hurling Championship
Cork Junior Hurling Championship